Tserenbaataryn Tsogtbayar (born 31 October 1970) is a Mongolian former wrestler who competed in the 1992 Summer Olympics and in the 1996 Summer Olympics.

References

1970 births
Living people
Olympic wrestlers of Mongolia
Wrestlers at the 1992 Summer Olympics
Wrestlers at the 1996 Summer Olympics
Mongolian male sport wrestlers
World Wrestling Championships medalists
Asian Games medalists in wrestling
Wrestlers at the 1994 Asian Games
Wrestlers at the 1998 Asian Games
Medalists at the 1994 Asian Games
Medalists at the 1998 Asian Games
Asian Games gold medalists for Mongolia
Asian Games bronze medalists for Mongolia
Asian Wrestling Championships medalists
20th-century Mongolian people
21st-century Mongolian people